Michael Anthony Smith (born February 23, 1961) is an American former professional baseball player, a right-handed pitcher who worked in 33 Major League games over five seasons (1984–1986; 1988–1989) for the Cincinnati Reds, Montreal Expos and Pittsburgh Pirates.

Career
Signed as an undrafted free agent by the Reds on May 11, 1981, Smith had a 15-year professional career; the first decade (1981–1990) was spent in "organized (Major and minor league) baseball", and then, after a five-year (1991–1995) hiatus, five seasons in independent league baseball (1996–2000).

All but one of his 33 big-league appearances came in relief.  His Major League victory came in his third career appearance on April 8, 1984, against the Philadelphia Phillies at Riverfront Stadium.  Smith relieved the Reds' Bill Scherrer in the top of the eleventh inning with two men on base and one out; the Phillies had pushed across a run against Scherrer and led, 7–6.  Smith retired the two hitters he faced — Garry Maddox and eventual Hall of Famer Mike Schmidt — to end the threat.  Cincinnati then scored two runs in the bottom of the 11th to win, 8–7.

In an odd coincidence, the losing pitcher when Smith earned his only victory was Larry Andersen. The winning pitcher when Smith (then with the Pittsburgh Pirates) lost his only game (August 15, 1989) was also Andersen (then with the Houston Astros).

All told, Smith worked in 49 innings pitched in the Majors, allowing 55 hits and 22 bases on balls.  He struck out 26 and recorded one career save. His one save came on September 12, 1988 during an Expos blowout victory over the Cardinals.

References

External links 

1961 births
Living people
Albany-Colonie Yankees players
American expatriate baseball players in Canada
Atlantic City Surf players
Bangor Blue Ox players
Billings Mustangs players
Buffalo Bisons (minor league) players
Cincinnati Reds players
Columbus Clippers players
Denver Zephyrs players
Hinds Eagles baseball players
Indianapolis Indians players
Major League Baseball pitchers
Montreal Expos players
Pacific Suns players
Pierce College people
Pittsburgh Pirates players
Rochester Red Wings players
Baseball players from Jackson, Mississippi
Tampa Tarpons (1957–1987) players
Vermont Reds players
Waterbury Reds players
Wichita Aeros players
Zion Pioneerzz players